Choledocystus is a genus of parasitic flukes, flatworms in the family Plagiorchiidae.

References 

 Choledocystus pennsylvaniensis: life history. JJ Sullivan and EE Byrd, Transactions of the American Microscopical Society, 1970
 Considerações sôbre o gênero Choledocystus pereira & Cuocolo, 1941 (Trematoda, Plagiorchiidae). JM Ruiz; Revista Brasileira de Biologia, 1949
 Redescription of Choledocystus hepaticus (Lutz, 1928) n. comb., and the status of C. linguatula (Rudolphi, 1819)(Trematoda: Plagiorchioidea). JJ Sullivan, Proceedings of the Helminthological Society of …, 1977

External links 

 

Plagiorchiidae
Plagiorchiida genera